Bengt Sæternes (born 1 January 1975) is a Norwegian former professional footballer who played as a centre forward from 1991 until 2011.

He began his playing career at local clubs Egersund and Eiger, whilst he had spells at Viking, Odd Grenland, Bodø/Glimt, Club Brugge, Brann, OB, and Vålerenga. Sæternes was capped seven times for Norway.

Before the 2012–13 Tercera División, Sæternes joined UD Vecindario as assistant coach on a one-year contract. He rejected offers from Norway in order to "learn everything I can of Spanish football."

Club career
Bengt Sæternes had short stints in both Viking and Odd Grenland until his career boosted in Bodø/Glimt. He was the club's top scorer in a number of seasons before he was sold to the Belgian First Division club Club Brugge. His stay in Belgium was ruined by multiple injuries, and he decided to return to Norway in the summer of 2004. Despite the general public believed that he would transfer to the champions Rosenborg, Bengt chose Brann instead. He made an instant impact in Bergen by demonstrating great goal scoring abilities clearly proven in the 2004 cup final, when he scored 3 goals. After a great 2004 season, the 2005 and the beginning of the 2006 season was a disappointment, mainly due to a long lasting injury. Sæternes never managed to copy the success from his first season in Brann. Since then he has played both in OB, Vålerenga and before he returned to Viking.

Ahead of the 2012 season, Viking terminated Sæternes' contract, after only one season at the club.

International career
Sæternes played three matches for Norway U-21 in 1996 and 1997, and was later capped seven times for Norway between 2002 and 2007.

Career statistics

Honours 
Club Brugge
Belgian First Division: 2002–03
Belgian Cup: 2003–04
Belgian Supercup: 2002, 2003

Brann
Tippeligaen: 2007
Norwegian Cup: 2004

Vålerenga
Norwegian Cup: 2008

Individual
Kniksen Striker of the Year: 2002

References

External links
 Vålerenga profile
 SK Brann profile

1975 births
Living people
People from Egersund
Association football forwards
Norwegian footballers
Norway international footballers
Norway under-21 international footballers
Viking FK players
Odds BK players
FK Bodø/Glimt players
Club Brugge KV players
SK Brann players
Odense Boldklub players
Vålerenga Fotball players
Eliteserien players
Norwegian First Division players
Belgian Pro League players
Danish Superliga players
Norwegian expatriate footballers
Expatriate footballers in Belgium
Expatriate men's footballers in Denmark
Norwegian expatriate sportspeople in Belgium
Norwegian expatriate sportspeople in Denmark
Kniksen Award winners
Norwegian football managers
Egersunds IK managers
Sandnes Ulf managers
Sportspeople from Rogaland